Agnovad is an area located in Surat, India.

See also 
List of tourist attractions in Surat

Suburban area of Surat
Neighbourhoods in Surat